At-Tīn ("The Fig, The Figtree") is the ninety-fifth surah of the Qur'an, with 8 ayat or verses.

Summary
1-4 Oaths that God created man "a most excellent fabric" 	
5-6 God has made all men vile except true believers 	
7-8 None may rightly deny the judgment-day 

This sura opens by mentioning the fig (the sura's namesake), the olive, Mount Sinai, and "this city secured" (generally considered to be Mecca).

Muhammad Asad, the author of The Message of The Qur'an comments on these verses:

The cosmology of the Qur'an states that God made mankind out of clay. This sura suggests not only this, but that the mould which God used for man was "the best possible". The lowness of the clay has set humanity apart from God; because clay is heavier and more solid than fire, from which the Jinn were made, and light, from which the angels came.

However, not all humanity is condemned to absolute removal from God's company. The passage continues that "those who believe and do what is right will have a reward that will never be cut off". A human life, when perfected, will thus rise above its modest origins, giving the human condition a unique possibility for glory on the Last Day. God's judgment, for Heaven or Hell, cannot be contradicted, for "Is not God the best of judges?"

Text 

1. 

2. 

3. 

4. 

5. 

6. 

7. 

8.

Explanation
The sura starts with three oaths; when the Quran presents an oath, there is a response (jawab) which is related to the oath. That is the central message of the surah. So without understanding the oath and its response, the message of the surah cannot be fully understood. In Classical Arabic, a location would be called by what it was famous for. So fig and olive can refer to two locations. Fig refers to Mount Judi, where Prophet Nuh's Ark landed, while At-Teen referring to Prophet Noah, the location where his Ark ship landed, az-Zaytoon referring to Jesus who was born in Palestine where olives grow or Al-Aqsa Mosque in Palestine. These oaths refer to the 2 fruits and also their locations. So the idea that fig and olive refers to both fruit and location was a view of the Sahabah and their early students. According to Ruh al-Ma'ani by Mahmud al-Alusi The intent in naming two fruits is to mention two mountains from the Holy land of Palestine. Toor refers to a lush, full of trees, green mountain. After Sayna in Sura Al-Mu'minoon, Seeneen is the second version of the name of Mount Sinai which existed in the Hebrew Language among the Scholars. This mountain was not known among the Arabs generally. It is generally believed that Muhammad was illiterate and he did not have any Jewish companions in the Makkan era when this surah was revealed. So without knowing the narrations of Moses or Hebrew language, Muhammad was describing the variations in language of Hebrew linguist scholars. This was a proof of the Quran being divine word of GOD for the people who had most classified and secret narratives of Moses. "This entrusted city", primarily referring to Mekah, also refers to Muhammad just as Noah, Moses and Jesus were referred by means of mentioning their relative locations in first two ayaat. A contemporary scholar Nouman Ali Khan suggests that it also refers to Abraham as he was the person who established the city Mekah.

Ayah 4 is Jawab-ul-qasam (Response of the Oath). Quran tells that the Messengers, Noah, Abraham/Ibraheem, Jesus, Moses, and Muhammad, the 'Uluw al 'azam or most persevering of the Prophets, are the best examples for humanity in the perfect (taqweem) form, they are higher examples for humanity in contrast with the animals and low levels that philosophers/psychologists have put forward for mankind. Then We return him to the lowest of the low in Ayah 5 signifies that ALLAH creates the human in a balance of body and spirit. When there is an imbalance i.e. too much worldly affairs and too little spiritual connection with GOD – human gets weak/hasty/ungrateful etc. But when there is a balance of spiritual worship to ALLAH and permissible worldly matters – man gets strong and in the most upright position. Lack of focus on keeping balance causes human to be reduced to the lowest thinking and actions. In the next Ayah the Sura presents the solution of human evilness. Except those who believe (inside actions). And do good deeds. (outside actions) This is just being alluded to, in this surah, but the full explanation is given in surah Al-Asr. Allah will give them a favor of Paradise, and the believers will not credit it to anyone except Allah.

After the oaths, referring to the messengers, letting the reader/listener realize that human being is more higher than other animal species eventually towards the end of the surah, the pondering question is being posed to the audience in penultimate ayah So what yet causes you to deny the Recompense ? And then the closing ayah of the Surah is also another question but this one is asked in a critique way that Is not Allah the most just of judges ? Allah's Messenger Muhammad would respond to this ayah even in Salah – with the following words

"سبحانك الله و بلا أنا على ذلك من الشهيدين"
subhanakAllah wa bal-laa ana 'ala dhalik min ash-shahideen

(Glory be to Allah, and no doubt I am on that from the witnesses).

Placement and coherence with other surahs
The idea of textual relation between the verses of a chapter has been discussed under various titles such as nazm and munasabah in non-English literature and coherence, text relations, intertextuality, and unity in English literature. Hamiduddin Farahi, an Islamic scholar of the Indian subcontinent, is known for his work on the concept of nazm, or coherence, in the Quran. Fakhruddin al-Razi (died 1209 CE), Zarkashi (died 1392) and several other classical as well as contemporary Quranic scholars have contributed to the studies. This surah belongs to the seventh and final group of surahs, which starts from Surah Al-Mulk (67) and runs to the end of the Quran. According to Javed Ahmad Ghamidi

References

External links
Quran 95 Clear Quran translation

Tin